Danny Spooner (16 December 1936 – 3 March 2017) was an Australian traditional folk singer and social historian. Born in England, he left school at the age of 13 and worked as a salvage tug and trawler skipper before moving to Australia in 1962. He rapidly became involved in the Melbourne folk revival centred on Frank Traynor's folk club, and was a major figure in the Australian folk scene thereafter.

He died on 3 March 2017.

Awards and honours
Danny Spooner was the Port Fairy Folk Festival artist of the year in 1995.

Discography

LPs
1965: A Wench and a Whale and a Pint of Good Ale, Discurio
1966: Soldiers and Sailors, Discurio
1977: Canterbury Fair, Anthology AR 001
1978: Danny Spooner and Friends, Anthology AR 002
1978: Limbo, Anthology AR 003
1978: Revived and Relieved (with Gordon McIntyre), Larrikin LRF 016
1986: I Got This One From..., Sandstock Music SSM 017
1987: When a Man's in Love, Sandstock Music, SSM 021
1988: We'll Either Bend or Break 'Er, Sandstock Music SSM 027
1989: All Around Down Under, Sandstock Music SSM 036 (with Martyn Wyndham-Read)

CDs
2002: When a Man's in Love (love songs from a man’s point of view)
2002: We'll Either Bend or Break 'Er (shanties)
2002: Launch Out on the Deep (sea songs)

Folk Trax
 2004: ‘ard Tack, (traditional Australian songs of work)
 2006: The Great Leviathan,  traditional songs of whaling
 2007: Years of Spooner, (compilation of songs Danny has sung 1965-2007)
 2007: Emerging Tradition, (fairly) contemporary Australian songs
 2008: Brave Bold Boys

References

External links

1936 births
2017 deaths
Australian folk singers
English emigrants to Australia